Ab Kuleh Sar-e Bozorg (also Romanized as Āb Kūleh Sar-e Bozorg; also known as Ābkaleh Sar and Āb Kalleh Sar-e Bozorg) is a village in Baladeh Rural District, Khorramabad District, Tonekabon County, Mazandaran Province, Iran. At the 2006 census, its population was 846, in 220 families.

References 

Populated places in Tonekabon County